Palazón is a surname. Notable people with the surname include:

Alfons Borrell i Palazón (1931–2020), Spanish painter
Isi Palazón (born 1994), Spanish footballer